Vor-Tech: Undercover Conversion Squad is an animated television series produced by Universal Cartoon Studios. It aired for one season of thirteen episodes in first-run syndication as part of Claster Television's "Power Block" package along with ReBoot, Beast Wars: Transformers and G.I. Joe Extreme, until the block's discontinuation in 1997. The series was based on a toy line developed by Kenner Products.

Overview
The VOR-Tech Undercover Conversion Squad is a group of secret agents led by Hudson Roarke. Their mission is to stop Hudson's older brother Damian Roarke—known as Lord Matrix—and his evil "Bio Mechs" from infecting the world with a techno-infectious plague. Similar to the M.A.S.K. franchise, the VOR-Tech agents had special masks and transforming vehicles, with special computer systems that imbue them and their vehicles with special powers.

The series was canceled after only thirteen episodes, and has not been released onto home video.

Cast
 Michael Donovan – Hudson Roarke
 David Sobolov – Lord Matrix (Damian Roarke)
 John Payne – Rick Rhodes
 Ian James Corlett – Brad Logan and Hardfire (Jason King)
 Scott McNeil – "Sonic Stinger" vehicle
 Venus Terzo – Miranda Ortiz
 Jim Byrnes – Vance Logan
 Andrea Libman – M.J. Sloan
 Linda Boyd
 Paulina Gillis – Frostbite (Dorian Harding)
 Saffron Henderson
 Mark Hildreth
 Richard Newman
 Pauline Newstone
 Dale Wilson – Tate Osborne
 Lenore Zann
 Ashleigh Ball
 Lyon Smith
 Tom Pickett – Jeremy MacMasters

References

External links
 Vor-Tech at Albert Penello's MASK Page
 The Action Figure Archive

1996 American television series debuts
1996 American television series endings
1996 Canadian television series debuts
1996 Canadian television series endings
1996 French television series debuts
1996 French television series endings
Television series by Universal Animation Studios
1990s American animated television series
1990s Canadian animated television series
1990s French animated television series
First-run syndicated television programs in the United States
English-language television shows
American children's animated action television series
American children's animated adventure television series
Canadian children's animated action television series
Canadian children's animated adventure television series
French children's animated action television series
French children's animated adventure television series
Television series by Claster Television